Fern  Britton (born 17 July 1957) is an English author and television presenter. She co-presented Breakfast Time in the 1980s, coming to mainstream national attention when hosting cookery game show Ready Steady Cook between 1994 and 2000 on BBC One. She presented ITV's This Morning programme from 1999 to 2009. In 2012, she participated in Strictly Come Dancing, where she was paired with professional dancer Artem Chigvintsev. Since 2010, she has also published a number of bestselling novels and books of short stories and non-fiction.

Early life and education

Britton was born in Ealing, London, to English actor Tony Britton and his first wife, Ruth Hawkins. She attended Dr Challoner's High School in Little Chalfont, Buckinghamshire, and the Central School of Speech and Drama, where she trained in stage management.

Career

Early work as a presenter
After working with The Cambridge Theatre Company, Britton began her broadcasting career in March 1980 in Plymouth working for Westward Television, the then-incumbent ITV regional company, as a continuity announcer and newsreader on the weeknightly local bulletin Westward Diary. After Westward lost its franchise at the end of 1981, Britton moved to the local BBC headquarters as a presenter with Spotlight in the South West, before moving to BBC 1's Breakfast Time, where she became the BBC's youngest-ever national news presenter. She was also a stand-in co-presenter on News After Noon during this period.

Britton then worked for TVS in Southampton, co-hosting the South edition of the news programme Coast to Coast with Fred Dinenage, as well as Coast to Coast People, The Television Show, Magic Moments and, as presenter with Stefan Buczacki, of That's Gardening. She stayed until TVS's franchise ended in December 1992.

In January 1993, she joined London News Network's London Tonight, before moving in April 1993 to GMTV to present the post-9:00 am slot, Top of the Morning. Britton moved back to Carlton Television to present After Five in 1994. She also appeared in the first two series of The Brian Conley Show.

ITV
Britton had guest presented This Morning since 1993, but from September 1999 she became a full-time host presenting the Friday edition with John Leslie. In 2002, she became the main host of the series along with John Leslie and, later, with Phillip Schofield.

In 2006, Britton co-presented the reality television show Soapstar Superstar. On 31 May 2007, she hosted the Classical Brit Awards at the Royal Albert Hall and she also co-hosted The British Soap Awards from 2006 until 2008 with Phillip Schofield.

In 2007, Britton presented her own  ITV Saturday night series called That's What I Call Television. In each show, she was joined by a celebrity co-host who selected their favourite TV moments from the 1980s and then reunited some of the original stars of selected shows. Julian Clary was her first co-host, followed by Matthew Kelly on the second show, and finally Bradley Walsh for the third. In December 2007, a Christmas edition was broadcast with co-host Ronnie Corbett, and a week later another was broadcast, this time with Desmond Lynam.

From 2008 until 2010, Britton co-presented a revival of the ITV show Mr & Mrs; this time it was an "All Star" version. She co-hosted the show with Phillip Schofield.

In November 2008, Britton announced she was to take a break from This Morning and return after the Christmas break in January 2009. Britton announced on 25 March 2009 that she was leaving This Morning, after 10 years, at the end of the current series. Two days after quitting This Morning, Britton pulled out of hosting the 2009 British Soap Awards alongside co-host Phillip Schofield.

On 17 July 2009, Britton's 52nd birthday, her farewell This Morning programme was aired. Britton made her comeback to ITV in 2017, presenting daytime series Culinary Genius. She also presented A Right Royal Quiz for the channel.

BBC
From 1994, Britton presented the television cookery gameshow Ready Steady Cook, which she continued until 2000. In 2009, Britton returned to the BBC and was a team captain on the BBC One trivia panel show As Seen on TV.

Since 2009, Britton hosted a series for BBC One called Fern Britton Meets... in which she interviewed high-profile personalities about their religious beliefs. The series attracted particular attention for an interview with former Prime Minister Tony Blair, in which he said he still would have thought it right that Iraqi president Saddam Hussein be removed even without evidence he had weapons of mass destruction.

Since 2014, Britton has presented The Big Allotment Challenge for BBC Two. The series was commissioned for a second series which aired in early 2015. In January 2016, she began presenting the BBC One antiques game show For What It's Worth.

Channel 4
On 2 November 2009, Britton appeared as a stand-in host on The Paul O'Grady Show for two weeks.

On 2 February 2011, it was confirmed that Britton would be taking over the 5:00 pm chatshow slot on Channel 4 that Paul O'Grady previously hosted. The show, Fern, began on 28 March 2011. The programme drew low audience figures and was reported to be facing a revamp, change of timeslot or cancellation after its second week on air. The show has since been confirmed as axed in its present form but Britton may work on other projects for Channel 4.

Strictly Come Dancing

On 10 September 2012, Britton was confirmed as one of the 14 celebrities taking part in the tenth series of Strictly Come Dancing. Her professional partner was  Artem Chigvintsev.

Other work
In 1988, Britton took part in Cinderella, a pantomime in which she played the role of Dandini at the  Mayflower Theatre in Southampton. She was presenting Coast to Coast from the city at the time and her preparation for the part was filmed for the programme.

Britton has featured in advertisements for several companies and causes, including appearances as herself in advertisements for several Ryvita Minis, and in the 2007 What's it going to take? campaign for the charitable organisation Women's Aid.

March 1998 saw the launch of Britton's first book, Fern's Family Favourites, published by André Deutsch and written with the cook and home economist Susie Magasiner. In November 2008, Fern, My Story was published by Michael Joseph. It went straight into The Sunday Times Top Ten Bestseller list where it remained for 12 weeks. Britton has written 6 novels New Beginnings, Hidden Treasures, The Holiday Home, A Seaside Affair, A Good Catch and The Postcard to date (November 2016). All have been in The Sunday Times bestseller list. In 2016, she signed a three-book deal with the publishers HarperCollins and is working on a television script.

She was the subject of This Is Your Life in 2002 when she was surprised by Michael Aspel at Wickham Hospital in Buckinghamshire.

In May 2011, Britton played herself in a short independently made film by Mark Davenport called Photoshopping alongside lead Joan Kempson.

In January 2018, it was announced that Britton would play Marie in the touring production of Calendar Girls The Musical.

Personal life 
Britton's first marriage was to TV executive Clive Jones. The couple met while Jones was still married and began an affair. Britton broke off their affair after a year but Jones turned up on her doorstep two days later, after leaving his wife for her. The couple married on 12 November 1988 in Southsea and have three children together: twin sons Jack and Harry (born 1994) and daughter Grace (born 1997). Her marriage to Jones disintegrated shortly after the birth of their daughter and the couple separated in January 1998. A year later, Britton began dating celebrity chef Phil Vickery after they met on the set of BBC Two's Ready Steady Cook. After her divorce was finalised, they married in spring 2000. They have one daughter together, Winifred (born 2001)  Vickery and Britton announced on their Twitter accounts on 29 January 2020 that they were separating after 20 years of marriage.

Filmography
Television

Bibliography

Novels
New Beginnings (2011)
Hidden Treasures (2012)
The Holiday Home (2013)
A Seaside Affair (2014)
A Good Catch (2015)
The Postcard (2016)
Coming Home (2018)
The Newcomer (2019)
Daughters of Cornwall (2020)

Short stories
The Stolen Weekend (2014)
A Cornish Carol (2014)
The Beach Cabin (2015)
A Cornish Gift (2017)

Non-fiction

Fern’s Family Favourites (1998)
Winter Treats and Summer Delights (with Susie Magasiner) (1999)
Fern and Phil's Family Food (with Phil Vickery) (2003)
Fern: The Autobiography  (2008)

References

External links

1957 births
Living people
Alumni of the Royal Central School of Speech and Drama
British television newsreaders and news presenters
British women television journalists
English game show hosts
English television journalists
English television presenters
English women journalists
GMTV presenters and reporters
ITV regional newsreaders and journalists
People educated at Dr Challoner's High School
People from Ealing